The Exchange Session Vol. 1 is a 2006 album by Kieran Hebden and Steve Reid, recorded in one day at The Exchange Mastering Studios in London. The album contains no overdubbing or editing.

Track listing
 "Morning Prayer" – 6:38
 "Soul Oscillations" – 14:19
 "Electricity and Drum Will Change Your Mind" – 15:45

Personnel
Steve Reid – drums and percussion
Kieran Hebden – electronics

References

External links
Kieran Hebden and Steve Reid - official website

2006 albums
Domino Recording Company albums
Albums produced by Kieran Hebden
Collaborative albums